Paul Eagler (September 24, 1890 – September 30, 1961) was an American special effects artist. He won an Academy Award for Best Special Effects and was nominated for another one in the same category.

Selected filmography
 Because of a Woman (1917)
 Sudden Jim (1917)
 The Millionaire Vagrant (1917)
 Bond of Fear (1917)
 Partners of the Tide (1921)
 Five Bad Men (1935)

Eagler won one Academy Award for Best Special Effects and was nominated for another one:

Won
 Portrait of Jennie (1948)

Nominated
 Foreign Correspondent (1940)

References

External links

Photograph of 1949 Oscar being awarded for Best Special Effects, at oscars.org

1890 births
1961 deaths
Special effects people
Best Visual Effects Academy Award winners
People from Douglas County, Illinois